Austroaeschna sigma is a species of large dragonfly in the family Telephlebiidae, 
known as the sigma darner. It inhabits the upper reaches of small mountain streams in New South Wales and south-eastern Queensland, Australia.

Austroaeschna sigma is a very dark dragonfly with pale markings. It appears similar to the multi-spotted darner, Austroaeschna multipunctata, which inhabits mountain streams in southern New South Wales and Victoria.

Gallery

See also
List of dragonflies of Australia

References

Telephlebiidae
Odonata of Australia
Endemic fauna of Australia
Taxa named by Günther Theischinger
Insects described in 1982